In books and documents, a section is a subdivision, especially of a chapter.

Sections are visually separated from each other with a section break, typically consisting of extra space between the sections, and sometimes also by a section heading for the latter section. They are a concern in the process of typography and pagination, where it may be desirable to have a page break follow a section break for the sake of aesthetics or readability.

In fiction, sections often represent scenes, and accordingly the space separating them is sometimes also called a  scene break.

Section form and numbering

In written narrative such as fiction, sections are not usually numbered or named. Section breaks are used to signal various changes in a story, including changes in time, location, point-of-view character, mood, tone, emotion, and pace. As a fiction-writing mode, the section break can be considered a transition, similar to a chapter break.

Some documents, especially legal documents, may have numbered sections, such as Section Two of the Canadian Charter of Rights and Freedoms or Internal Revenue Code section 183. The section sign (§) may be used in referring to sections and subsections. Subsections are often written in lowercase Roman numerals, e.g. Section 51(xxvi) of the Australian Constitution.

The dotted-decimal section-numbering scheme commonly used in scientific and technical documents is defined by International Standard ISO 2145.

A document may also be considered to be divided into sections by its headings and subheadings, which may be used for a table of contents. For example, the hierarchical sections used in Wikipedia can be compiled into a table of contents for an article. Many books, however, only have chapter headings in the table of contents.

While a chapter may be divided by section breaks, a group of chapters is conventionally called a "part", often identified with a Roman numeral, e.g. "Part II".

Reference material may be divided into sections. The section headers of a Chinese dictionary are one example.

Flourished section breaks 

Space between paragraphs in a section break is sometimes accompanied by a dinkus, an asterism (⁂), a horizontal rule, fleurons (❦), or other ornamental symbols. An ornamental symbol used as section break does not have a generally accepted name. Such a typographic device can be referred to as a dinkus, a space break symbol, a paragraph separator, a paragraph divider, a horizontal divider, a thought break, or as an instance of filigree or flourish. Ornamental section breaks can be created using glyphs, rows of lozenges, dingbats, or other miscellaneous symbols. Fonts such as Webdings and Wingdings include many such glyphs.

In HTML, horizontal rules can be generated using the <hr> tag, which generates a paragraph-level thematic break. For more ornate presentation, CSS can be used to replace the line with an image.

See also 
 Asterism 
 Dinkus 
 Fleuron (typography) 
 Section sign 
 Section (bookbinding)
 Paragraph
 Paragraphos

Writing
Book design
Book terminology
Publishing
Typography